The assassination of Sergei Mironovich Kirov, head of the Leningrad party organization, member of the Politburo, the Orgburo, and secretary of the Central Committee of the All-Union Communist Party of Bolsheviks, took place on December 1, 1934, in Smolny. The murder was committed by Leonid Nikolaev.

Course of events

Murder 
Nikolaev planned to make the first attempt to assassinate Kirov on October 15, 1934. On that day, he was detained by guards near Kirov's house on Kamennoostrovsky Prospekt, but, upon presentation of a party card and a weapon permit, he was released.

On December 1, 1934, at about 4:30 p.m., Nikolaev ambushed Kirov near his office in the corridor on the third floor of the Smolny and fired a revolver into his head. The killer tried to commit suicide by shooting himself, but missed and lost consciousness. He was detained at the scene of the crime in a state of shock and taken to the psychiatric hospital No. 2, where, after the necessary procedures, he came to his senses at about nine o'clock in the evening.

Investigation, trial and execution 
A criminal case was initiated against Nikolaev and his acquaintances by the NKVD, on charges of participating in an underground organization headed by the "Leningrad Center". NKVD chief Genrikh Yagoda and his staff tried to "softly" sabotage the version imposed on them by Stalin about the involvement in the murder of Kirov of former oppositionists – Grigori Zinoviev, Lev Kamenev and their supporters. However, Yagoda's deputy Nikolai Yezhov, to the displeasure of the Chekists, directed the investigation in the “right” direction. Yezhov himself recalled this at the February-March 1937 plenum:
... Comrade Stalin, as I remember now, called me and Kosarev and said: "Look for murderers among the Zinovievites." I must say that the Chekists did not believe in this and, just in case, they insured themselves somewhere else along a different line, along a foreign line, perhaps something will pop up there ...

On December 28–29, 1934, the visiting session of the Military Collegium of the Supreme Court of the Soviet Union, chaired by Vasiliy Ulrikh, assembled in Leningrad for the trial of Nikolaev and 13 other defendants (Antonov, Zvezdov, Yuskin, Sokolov, Kotolynov, Shatsky, Tolmazov, Myasnikov, Khanik, Levin, Soskitsky, Rumyantsev and Mandelstam). Most of the defendants pleaded not guilty. Nikolaev confirmed his confessions only after Ulrikh interrogated him in the absence of the other defendants. At 5:45am on December 29, the verdict was announced to Nikolaev and all the rest condemned to death; an hour later they were shot. According to the story of the escort, having heard the verdict, Nikolaev shouted: “Deceived!”.

Further reprisals 
Milda Draule, Nikolaev's wife, was first expelled from the party after Kirov's assassination. In the same month, she was arrested and shot on March 10, 1935. Other relatives and acquaintances of Nikolaev were repressed: mother, brother, sisters, cousin, relatives of his wife.

Historian Yu. N. Zhukov argued that in addition to the direct killer, the defendants were close and distant relatives of Nikolaev. The sister of O. Draule and her husband, R. Kulisher, were also shot. At five trials, 17 people were sentenced to death by firing squad, 76 people to imprisonment, and 30 people to exile. 988 people were expelled, including former oppositionists from the Zinoviev group. Later, about 12 thousand "socially alien elements" were repressed, namely, former nobles, senators, generals, and intelligentsia.

Versions of the murder 
As the historian O. Khlevnyuk notes, Kirov was a loyal ally of Stalin and became a victim of an assassination attempt by a lone Leonid Nikolaev, however, under Khrushchev, a version arose that Kirov opposed Stalin at the head of some opposition, which is why he was killed on Stalin's orders, however, a number of commissions that examined this case and looking for evidence of a conspiracy, found no direct evidence. In 1961, Khrushchev received a letter from the escort of a special cell at the military collegium, which stated that Nikolaev had slandered the rest of the defendants in the investigation.

Version of Stalin's involvement 
Nikita Khrushchev in his memoirs claimed that the assassination of Kirov was organized by Stalin and the NKVD of the USSR. After the XX Congress of the CPSU, on the initiative of Khrushchev, a Special Commission of the Central Committee of the CPSU headed by N. M. Shvernik with the participation of party leader O. G. Shatunovskaya was created to investigate the issue. The materials of the commission were not published during the period of Khrushchev, who told Shatunovskaya that the results would be published in 15 years. V. M. Molotov in 1979 claimed that the commission had established that Stalin was not involved in the murder, and Khrushchev refused to publish materials that were unfavorable to him. Subsequently, Shatunovskaya expressed confidence that the documents compromising Stalin were seized. In her letter to A.N. Yakovlev dated June 13, 1989, she listed the specific documents she saw and disappeared from the case.

In 1990, during an investigation conducted by the prosecutorial and investigative team of the USSR Prosecutor's Office, the Chief Military Prosecutor's Office and the USSR State Security Committee, together with employees of the Party Control Committee under the CPSU Central Committee, it was concluded that the involvement of the NKVD and Stalin personally was not found. In a note from the Central Control Commission of the Communist Party of the RSFSR, which checked Shatunovskaya's statement, it was stated that investigators from the NKVD “artificially connected Nikolaev with former members of the Zinoviev opposition Kotolynov, Rumyantsev, Tolmazov and others (13 people in total), falsified criminal cases” of a large group of citizens who were subsequently shot.

Despite this decision of the prosecutor's office, the literature often expresses points of view about Stalin's involvement in the murder of Kirov (and also, as a variant of it, that Nikolaev subjectively acted alone according to his own intentions, but Stalin found out about them and allowed the murder to take place), so and in favor of the lone killer version.

References 

Assassination of Sergei Kirov